Krasnodar Stadium is a football stadium in Krasnodar, Russia. It hosts FC Krasnodar of the Russian Premier League. It has a capacity of 35,074 spectators.

The stadium was designed by von Gerkan, Marg and Partners (gmp) together with SPEECH architectural office and built by Contractor Esta Construction. The stadium's interior project was developed by Maxim Rymar Architectural Studio.

Gallery

See also
List of football stadiums in Russia

References

Football venues in Russia
Sport in Krasnodar
FC Krasnodar
Buildings and structures in Krasnodar
Sports venues completed in 2016
2016 establishments in Russia